Lecithocera shanpinensis is a moth in the family Lecithoceridae first described by Kyu-Tek Park in 1999. It is found in Taiwan.

The wingspan is 10.5 mm. The forewings are brown, with dark brown scales scattered throughout. The discal spot is absent. The hindwings are grey.

Etymology
The species name is derived from the type locality.

References

Moths described in 1999
shanpinensis